Lake Chagan or Lake Shagan (Şağan), also known as Lake Balapan, is a lake in Kazakhstan created by the Chagan nuclear test on January 15, 1965, which was conducted as part of the Soviet Union Nuclear Explosions for the National Economy program. A 140 kiloton device was placed in a  hole in the dry bed at the confluence of the Shagan and Ashchysu rivers.

The lake's water comes from the Shagan River, a tributary of the Irtysh River. To the south, the rim of the crater holds back the waters of a second reservoir.

Locals fish in the lake, despite warnings by authorities that it is hazardous.

Media
In Netflix's documentary series Dark Tourist (season 1 episode 4, "The Stans"), David Farrier visits and swims in Lake Chagan, as well as eats a fish from the lake, during his tour of Kazakhstan.

See also
 Sedan (nuclear test) – an American cratering detonation
 Pechora–Kama Canal – a proposed canal project involving nuclear excavation
 Lake Karachay – a natural lake highly contaminated by the dumping of high-level nuclear waste
 Volcanic crater lake – a body of water normally formed by volcanic or meteoric events

References

External links

Chagan
Chagan
Peaceful nuclear explosions
Explosion craters